Hubertus Hoyt (born November 3, 1955), also known as Bert Hoyt, is an American business executive and former professional tennis player. He has held executive roles at Puma and Nike.

Hoyt is a native of Newburgh, New York and was active on the professional tennis tour in the late 1970s and early 1980s, reaching a best world ranking of 195. He featured in the singles main draw of the 1979 French Open.

References

External links
 
 

1955 births
Living people
American male tennis players
American business executives
Tennis people from New York (state)
Sportspeople from Newburgh, New York
Newburgh Free Academy alumni